Santo António is a freguesia (civil parish) and district of Lisbon, the capital of Portugal. Located in central Lisbon, Santo António is east of Campo de Ourique, north of Santa Maria Maior and Misericórdia, west of Arroios, and south of Avenidas Novas. It is known for its luxury shopping, Michelin star restaurants, and as home to many of Lisbon's most recognizable landmarks and neighborhoods, such as Marquis of Pombal Square, Avenida da Liberdade, and Restauradores Square. The population in 2011 was 11,836.

History
This freguesia was created with the 2012 Administrative Reform of Lisbon, merging the former parishes of São Mamede, São José and Coração de Jesus.

Landmarks
Avenida da Liberdade
Marquis of Pombal Square
Lisbon Botanical Garden
Restauradores Square
Monument to the Restorers
Palacete Mayer
Palace of the Counts of Redondo

References

Parishes of Lisbon